Najm ad-Din Ilghazi ibn Artuq (died November 8, 1122) was the Turkmen Artukid ruler of Mardin from 1107 to 1122. He was born into the Oghuz tribe of Döğer.

Biography 
His father Artuk Bey was the founder of the Artukid dynasty, and had been appointed governor of Jerusalem by the Seljuq emir Tutush. When Artuk died, Ilghazi and his brother Sökmen succeeded him as governors of Jerusalem. In 1096, Ilghazi allied with Duqaq of Damascus and Yaghi-Siyan of Antioch against Radwan of Aleppo; Duqaq and Radwan were fighting for control of Syria after the death of Tutush. Ilghazi and Dukak eventually quarrelled and Ilghazi was imprisoned, leading to the capture of Jerusalem by his brother Sökmen, but Ilgazi recovered the city when he was released. He held it until the city was captured by the Fatimid vizier of Egypt, al-Afdal Shahanshah, in 1098. After this he sought to make a name for himself in the Jezirah, where his brothers had also established themselves. He then entered the service of the Seljuq sultan Mahmud I, who granted him Hulwan and made him shihna of Baghdad, an office which oversaw the affairs of the caliph on behalf of the sultan.

Ilghazi was dismissed as shihna in 1104 and became leader of the Artukid family after the death of Sökmen that year. This was disputed by Sökmen's son Ibrahim, but Ilghazi took Mardin from him in 1108. As head of the Artukids he made no lasting alliances and frequently switched sides, allying with both fellow Muslims and Christian crusaders whenever he saw fit. In 1110, he participated in an unsuccessful siege of Edessa. In 1114, he and his nephew Balak (future emir of Aleppo) defeated the Seljuq governor of Mosul, Aqsunqur al-Bursuqi, and captured Mas'ud, son of the Seljuq sultan. In 1115, Ilghazi besieged Homs, but was captured briefly by its governor Khir-Khan. Later that year, Roger of Antioch, Baldwin I of Jerusalem, Pons of Tripoli, and Baldwin II of Edessa defended Antioch against the Seljuq general Bursuq ibn Bursuq (not to be confused with al-Bursuki), with the aid of Ilghazi, Toghtekin of Damascus, and Lulu of Aleppo, all enemies of Bursuk. These two armies did not come to battle, although Bursuk was later defeated by Roger at the Battle of Sarmin.

Ilghazi gained control of Aleppo after the assassination of Lulu in 1117. He was invited to take control by princess Amina Khatun.  In 1118, he took control of Mayyafiriqin and pacified the surrounding countryside. In 1119, Ilghazi defeated and killed Roger at the Battle of Ager Sanguinis; Ibn al-Qalanisi describes the victory as "one of the finest of victories, and such plenitude of divine aid was never granted to Islam in all its past ages." The Antiochene towns of Atharib, Zerdana, Sarmin, Ma'arrat al-Numan and Kafartab fell to his army. "Il Ghazi, however, was unable to extract full profit from his victory. His prolonged drunkenness deprived his army of leadership, and left the Turkmens free to ... scatter after plunder."

Baldwin II (now Baldwin II of Jerusalem) soon arrived to drive Ilghazi back, inflicting heavy losses on the Turks in the hard-fought Battle of Hab on August 14, 1119. The next year Ilghazi took Nisibin, and then pillaged the County of Edessa before turning north towards Armenia. In 1121, he made peace with the crusaders, and with supposedly up to 250,000–350,000 troops, including men led by his son-in-law Sadaqah and Sultan Malik of Ganja, he invaded Georgia. David IV of Georgia met him at the Battle of Didgori and Ilgazi was defeated. According to Matthew of Edessa 400 000 Seljuks were killed. Among the various leaders, only Ilghazi and his son-in-law Dubais escaped.

In 1122, Ilghazi and Balak defeated Joscelin I of Edessa and took him prisoner, but Ilgazi died in November of that year at Diyarbekir. He was buried at Mayyafariqin (Silvan today). Balak succeeded him in Aleppo and his sons Suleiman and Timurtash succeeded him in Mardin.

Ibn al-Qalanisi is generally neutral on the character of Ilghazi, and describes only one "disgraceful habit" of the emir: "Now when Ilghazi drank wine and it got the better of him, he habitually remained for several days in a state of intoxication, without recovering his senses sufficiently to take control or to be consulted on any matter or decision." The Antiochene chronicler Walter the Chancellor was at first also neutral towards Ilghazi, until the Battle of Ager Sanguinis, in which Walter himself was captured; Ilghazi (written as "Algazi" in Latin) is then described as a "tyrant" and the "prince of the delusion and dissent of the Turcomans." Walter also remarks on Ilghazi's drunkenness.

Family and issue
Ilghazi married first Farkhunda Khatun, the daughter of Radwan of Aleppo, but he never actually met her and the marriage was never consummated. He then married the daughter of Toghtekin of Damascus and had the following children:

 Ayaz
 Guhar Khatun, married Dubais
 al-Bazm
 Shams ad-Daula Sulaiman
 Safra Khatun, married Husam ad-Din Qurti ibn Toghlan Arslan
 Yumna Khatun, married Sa'd ad-Daula Il-aldi of Amid
 al-Sa'id Husam ad-Din Timurtash

He also had a son, Umar, by a concubine, and Nasr, by a slave; another possible son was named Kirzil.

See also 
 Artukid dynasty
 Ahlatshahs

Notes

Sources 
 Steven Runciman, A History of the Crusades, vol. I: The First Crusade and the Foundation of the Kingdom of Jerusalem. Cambridge University Press, 1951.
 Kenneth Setton, ed. A History of the Crusades, vol. I. University of Pennsylvania Press, 1958 (available online).
 William of Tyre. A History of Deeds Done Beyond the Sea. Edited and translated by E. A. Babcock and A. C. Krey. Columbia University Press, 1943.
 Armenia and the Crusades, Tenth to Twelfth Centuries: The Chronicle of Matthew of Edessa. Translated by Ara Edmond Dostourian. National Association for Armenian Studies and Research, 1993.
 The Damascus Chronicle of the Crusades: Extracted and Translated from the Chronicle of Ibn al-Qalanisi. H.A.R. Gibb, London, 1932.
 Walter the Chancellor's "The Antiochene Wars": A Translation and Commentary, trans. Thomas S. Asbridge and Susan B. Edgington, Ashgate, 1999. 
 Carole Hillenbrand, "The career of Najm al-Din Il-Ghazi", Der Islam 58 (1981). 
 Carole Hillenbrand, A Muslim Principality in Crusader Times: The Early Artuqid State. Nederlands Historisch-Archaeologisch Instituut, 1990.
 Carole Hillenbrand, The Crusades: Islamic Perspectives. Routledge, 2000.
 Smail, R. C. Crusading Warfare 1097–1193. New York: Barnes & Noble Books, (1956) 1995. 

Artuqids
Turkic rulers
Anatolian beyliks
Muslims of the First Crusade
1122 deaths
Year of birth unknown
11th-century Turkic people
History of Mardin Province
Seljuk Empire
Nizari Ismaili–Seljuk relations
People of the Nizari–Seljuk wars